Wu Jie (born October 1963) is a Chinese military pilot and taikonaut selected as part of the Shenzhou program.

Biography
Wu Jie was born in Zhengzhou, Henan province, China. In 1987 he graduated from the People's Liberation Army Air Force (PLAAF) Engineering College and later the PLAAF Flight College. A fighter pilot in the PLAAF, he had accumulated 1100 flight-hours.

In November 1996, he and Li Qinglong, started training at the Russian Yuri Gagarin Cosmonauts Training Center. When they returned to China a year later, they acted as the trainers for the first group of Shenzhou astronauts. Before the flight of Shenzhou 5 it was thought that he or Li Qinglong would fly the mission, that was eventually flown by Yang Liwei.

Wu was then one of the six astronauts in the final training for Shenzhou 6.

External links

Wu Jie at the Encyclopedia Astronautica. Accessed 23 July 2005.
Spacefacts biography of Wu Jie

1963 births
Living people
People's Liberation Army Astronaut Corps
Shenzhou program
People from Zhengzhou
People's Liberation Army Air Force personnel